Lagos Fashion Week (LagosFW) is an annual multi-day clothing trade show that takes place in Lagos, Nigeria. It was founded in 2011 by Omoyemi Akerele and it is Africa’s largest fashion event drawing considerable media attention, nationally and internationally. It showcases over 60 Nigerian and African fashion designers to a global audience of more than 40.000 retailers, media and consumers. It has helped propel African designers and fashion brands, such as Orange Culture, Lisa Folawiyo and Christie Brown to international recognition.

History 
Lagos Fashion Week was founded in 2011 by Omoyemi Akerele and is produced by fashion business development agency Style House Files. The event aims to give the Nigerian and African fashion industry international recognition, by bringing together media, buyers, manufacturers and consumers. As a leading fashion event on the international fashion calendar, Lagos Fashion Week includes runway shows, showroom presentations and an online platform LagosFW Digital. Lagos Fashion Week also hosts a number of initiatives, talk series and competitions including Woven Threads, Fashion Focus Africa, Fashion Business Series, Green Access and the Visual Makers Fellowship. Lagos Fashion Week has worked with international fashion weeks to give African brands the opportunity to showcase, and collaborated with the British Council, London Fashion Week, Nigerian Export Promotion Council (NEPC) and Pitti Immagine.

The 2011 inaugural event was hosted in Lagos and presented more than 40 designers including Lisa Folawiyo, Nkwo, Maki Oh and Bridget Awosika. In the same year, The Fashion Focus Fund (formerly Young Designer of The Year) was established as an annual competition aimed at developing the next generation of emerging Nigerian fashion talent. The year-long incubator programme was created to assist designers in establishing the right structure and practices to facilitate scalability, sustainability and business growth. Past beneficiaries include Orange Culture, IAMISIGO, Kenneth Ize, Emmy Kasbit and Ejiro Amos Tafiri.

Heineken Nigeria has since 2015 been the official title sponsor of Lagos Fashion Week. In the same year, the competition and runway show Green Access was established to raise awareness amongst Nigerian students of the need to make sustainable choices in the fashion industry.  

In 2017, founder Omoyemi Akerele was on the advisory committee for exhibition Items: Is Fashion Modern? at the Museum of Modern Art (MoMA). The exhibition featured African designers including Loza Maleombho and African textiles including Kente, African inspired textiles like real Dutch wax, and Dashiki from Lagos. Akerele also spoke about the global impact of African fashion at the accompanying MoMA Live conference.

In 2019 the event received more than 30 designers from all over the world.

In 2020 during the Covid-19 pandemic, the Woven Threads initiative was launched focusing on driving the industry towards a circular fashion economy in Africa. A talk series and physical showroom have addressed how the continent can embrace traditional textiles, waste management and the role technology plays in a new creative and sustainable fashion industry. Expert sessions have included Orsola De Castro, Bandana Tewari, Dana Thomas, Jumoke Oduwole, Nike Ogunlesi, Sarah Diouf and Yegwa Ukpo. Sponsored by Heineken, a Design Challenge gave designers the opportunity to engage with the creative community from home, celebrating innovative and sustainable design in Africa.

In 2021, Omoyemi Akerele was named Zero Oil Ambassador for Nigeria by the CEO of the Nigerian Export Promotion Council & President ECOWAS TPO Network, Mr Olusegun Awolowo, and given a five hundred million Naira grant to support thirty Nigerian brands in the fashion industry.

In 2022, runway footage from Lagos Fashion Week was featured in the Victoria & Albert Museum’s exhibition Africa Fashion and several African designers, photographers and creatives were exhibited. Akerele gave the keynote address at the private view and was an advisor to the curatorial team.

Designers 

The runway show schedule has presented a number of designers including:

 Andrea Iyamah 
 Anyango Mpinga 
 Assian 
 Awa Meite 
 Bloke 
 Bridget Awosika 
 Chiip O Neal 
 Christie Brown 
 CLAN 
 Cynthia Abila 
 Deola 
 DNA by Iconic Invanity 
 DZYN 
 Ejiro Amos Tafiri 
 Eki Silk 
 Elie Kuame 
 Emmy Kasbit 
 Fruche 
 Gozel Green 
 Haute Baso 
 House of Kaya  
 IAMISIGO 
 Idma Nof 
 Imad Eduso 
 Jermiane Bleu 
 JZO 
 Kelechi Odu 
 Kiki Kamanu 
 Kiko Romeo 
 Laduma by Maxhosa 
 Lagos Space Programme 
 Larry Jay 
 Lisa Folawiyo
 Loza Maleombho 
 Mai Atafo 
 Maki Oh 
 Maxivive 
 Meena 
 Moofa Moshions 
 Nao.Li.La 
 Niuku 
 Nkwo  
 Odio Mimonet 
 Onalaja 
 Orange Culture 
 Post Imperial 
 Rich Mnisi 
 Rick Dusi 
 Selly Raby Kane 
 Sindiso Khumalo 
 Sisiano 
 Studio 189 
 Style Temple 
 Sunny Rose 
 TJWHo 
 Tongoro 
 Tokyo James 
 Tsemaye Binitie 
 Ugo Monye 
 Washington Roberts

See also

List of fashion events
Fashion week

References

Fashion events in Nigeria
Culture in Lagos
Recurring events established in 2011
Nigerian fashion
Annual events in Nigeria
Tourist attractions in Lagos
Annual events in Lagos
2011 establishments in Nigeria
Fashion weeks